Purulia Sadar subdivision is a subdivision of the Purulia district in the state of West Bengal, India.

History
Purulia district was divided into four subdivisions, viz., Purulia Sadar, Manbazar, Jhalda and Raghunathpur, with effect from 6 April 2017, as per Order No. 100-AR/P/2R-2/1999 dated 30 March 2017 issued by the Government of West Bengal, in the Kolkata Gazette dated 30 March 2017.

Subdivisions
Purulia district is divided into the following administrative subdivisions:

Note: The 2011 census data has been recast as per reorganisation of the subdivisions. There may be minor variations.

Police stations
Police stations in the Purulia Sadar subdivision have the following features and jurisdiction:

Blocks
Community development blocks in Purulia Sadar subdivision are:

Gram panchayats
Gram panchayats in Purulia Sadar subdivision are :
 Arsha: Arsha, Chatuhansa, Hensla, Puara, Beldih, Hetgugui, Mankiary and Sirkabad.
 Balarampur block: Balarampur, Bela, Genrua, Tentlow, Baraurma, Darda and Ghatbera–Kerowa.  
 Hura block: Chatumadar, Jabarrah, Ladhurka, Rakhera–Bispuria, Daldali, Kalabani, Lakhanpur, Hura, Keshergarh and Maguria–Lalpur.
 Purulia–I block: Bhandarpuara–Chipida, Dimdiha, Lagda, Durku, Manara, Chakaltore, Garafusra and Sonaijuri.
 Purulia–II block: Agoya–Narra, Chharradumdumi, Hutmura, Belma, Ghonga, Pindra, Bhangra, Golamara and Raghabpur.

Education
Given in the table below (data in numbers) is a comprehensive picture of the education scenario in Purulia district, after reorganisation of the district in 2017, with data for the year 2013-14. (There may be minor variations because of data recasting).:

Note: Primary schools include junior basic schools; middle schools, high schools and higher secondary schools include madrasahs; technical schools include junior technical schools, junior government polytechnics, industrial technical institutes, industrial training centres, nursing training institutes etc.; technical and professional colleges include engineering colleges, medical colleges, para-medical institutes, management colleges, teachers training and nursing training colleges, law colleges, art colleges, music colleges etc. Special and non-formal education centres include sishu siksha kendras, madhyamik siksha kendras, centres of Rabindra mukta vidyalaya, recognised Sanskrit tols, institutions for the blind and other handicapped persons, Anganwadi centres, reformatory schools etc.

Educational institutions
The following institutions are located in Purulia Sadar subdivision:
Sidho Kanho Birsha University was established in 2010 at Purulia.
Purulia Government Medical College & Hospital is located at Hatuara, Purulia.
Jagannath Kishore College was established at Purulia in 1948.
Nistarini Women's College was established in 1957 at Purulia.
Arsha College  was established  at Arsha in 2009.
Balarampur College was established at Rangadih, Balarampur in 1985.
Mahatma Gandhi College was established at Daldali, Lalpur in 1981.

Healthcare
The table below (all data in numbers) presents an overview of the medical facilities available and patients treated in the hospitals, health centres and sub-centres in 2014 in Purulia district, after reorganisation of the district in 2017, with data for the year 2013-14. (There may be minor variations because of data recasting).:

.* Excluding nursing homes.

Medical facilities
Medical facilities in Purulia Sadar subdivision are as follows:

Hospitals: (Name, location, beds) 

Deben Mahato Hospital (District Hospital), Purulia M, 506 beds
Purulia Jail Hospital, Purulia M, 33 beds
Purulia Police Hospital, Purulia M, 20 beds
Purulia Mental Hospital, Purulia M, 200 beds

Rural Hospitals: (Name, CD block, location, beds) 
Chakaltore Rural Hospital, Purulia I CD block, Chakaltor, 30 beds
Kushtor Rural Hospital, Purulia II CD block, Kustor, 30 beds
Hura Rural Hospital, Hura CD block, Hura, 30 beds
Bansgarh Rural Hospital, Balarampur CD block, Rangadih, 30 beds
Sirkabad Rural Hospital, Arsha CD block, Sirkabad, 30 beds

Primary Health Centres : (CD block-wise)(CD block, PHC location, beds)
Purulia I CD block: Pichasi (10), Belkuri (2), Lagda (6)
Purulia II CD block: Hutmura (10), Chayanpur (6)
Arsha CD block: Kantadih (4), Arsha (10)
Balarampur CD block: Kerwa (10), Nekray (6), Malti (6)
Hura CD block: Chatumadar (4), Khairipihira (4), Ladurkha (10)

Electoral constituencies

Lok Sabha (parliamentary) and Vidhan Sabha (state assembly) constituencies in Purulia district were as follows:

References

Subdivisions of West Bengal
Subdivisions in Purulia district
Purulia district